The Fabulet River is a tributary of the Iroquois River (Nottaway River), in the administrative region of Nord-du-Québec, in the Canadian province of Quebec, in Canada.

This hydrographic slope does not have forest access roads. The surface of the river is usually frozen from early November to mid-May, however, safe ice circulation is generally from mid-November to mid-April.

Geography 
The main neighboring hydrographic slopes are:
North side: Richerville River, Nottaway River;
East side: Richerville River, Nottaway River;
South side: Kitchigama River, Iroquois River (Nottaway River);
West side: Kitchigama River, Iroquois River (Nottaway River).

The Fabulet River originates from an unidentified lake located at:
 Southwest of the Nottaway River;
 Southeast of the mouth of the Fabulet River;
 Southeast of the mouth of the Iroquois River (Nottaway River);
 South of the mouth of the Nottaway River;
 South of downtown Matagami

From its source in the Township of Desmazures, the Fabulet River flows over  according to the following segments:
 southerly and westward across an unidentified lake (elevation:  to its mouth;
 northwesterly to the South shore of Fabulet Lake;
 northwesterly across Lake Fabulet on its full length;
 northwesterly, then southwesterly, to a stream (from the Southeast);
 northwesterly by collecting several streams to its mouth.

The Fabulet River flows into a river bend on the eastern shore of the Iroquois River (Nottaway River). This confluence is located at:
 Southeast of the mouth of the Iroquois River (Nottaway River);
 Southeast of the mouth of the Nottaway River (confluence with Rupert Bay);
 Northwest of downtown Matagami;
 South of the Nottaway River.

Toponymy 
The term "Fabulet" is a family name of French origin.

The toponym "Fabulet River" was formalized on December 5, 1968, at the Commission de toponymie du Québec, i.e. at the creation of this commission

References

See also 
James Bay
Rupert Bay
Nottaway River
Iroquois River (Nottaway River)
List of rivers of Quebec

Rivers of Nord-du-Québec